Do Dehak Rural District is a rural district (dehestan) in the Central District of Delijan County, Markazi Province, Iran. At the 2006 census, its population was 3,332, in 925 families. The rural district has 11 villages.

References 

Rural Districts of Markazi Province
Delijan County